= Environmental conservation =

Environmental conservation may refer to:

- Environmental protection
- Nature conservation
